The Tagea Brandts Rejselegat (Travel Scholarship) is a Danish award to women who have made a significant contribution in science, literature or art. The grant, which is given without application, was created and endowed by Danish industrialist Vilhelm Brandt (1854–1921) in 1905 in honor of his wife, Tagea Brandt.
It is awarded annually on 17 March, her birthday.
The charter of 1922 provides that it shall be given to outstanding women in science, art, music, literature and theater arts (particularly in this case to actresses at the Royal Danish Theatre). The intent is for the awardee to both broaden her horizons while promoting Danish society abroad, and to benefit from vacation and rest time.

The first scholarships were given in 1924; the first time the amount was DKK 10.000, in 1958 it was increased to DKK 15.000, in 1967 to 25.000, later to 50,000, and currently it is DKK 75.000, which usually is given to 2-3 women annually.

Recipients of the Tagea Brandt Award

See also

 Tagea Brandt
 Women in Denmark
 List of awards honoring women
 List of European art awards

References

External links

Danish culture
Danish awards
Awards honoring women
Visual arts awards
Danish literary awards
Awards established in 1924
1924 establishments in Denmark